Hellinsia chamelai is a moth in a family Pterophoridae that is found in Mexico and Costa Rica.

Adults are black and have enlarged scale tufts on the hind legs. The wings have a purplish iridescence. They have a wasp-like appearance. Adults are primarily diurnal, which is unusual for the family Pterophoridae. They have been recorded in July, August, September, October and December in Mexico and in June in Costa Rica. Adults are on wing from June and July to October, and in December.

The hostplant is unknown, but adults have been recorded flying in daytime around flowers of an arboreal Croton species.

References 

chamelai
Moths described in 1992
Moths of Central America